John Carlos Matanguihan Hermida Jr., better known as Borgie Hermida, is a Filipino professional basketball coach and former player. He is the senior team manager for the Bataan Risers of the Maharlika Pilipinas Basketball League (MPBL) and assistant coach of NLEX Road Warriors of the Philippine Basketball Association (PBA). 

He was drafted 17th overall in the 2010 PBA draft by the Barako Bull Energy Boosters. During his five seasons in college with the San Beda Red Lions, he won 4 titles from 2006 to 2008 and 2010. He has won 4 titles with the San Beda Red Lions 2006-2008 and 2010, and as a Mythical Five Member of NCAA Season 86 Before graduating from San Beda after 16 years of service to the school.

Professional career
Hermida was drafted seventeenth overall by Barako Bull Energy Boosters in the 2010 PBA draft. However, Hermida was released by the team, now known as Shopinas.com Clickers at the end of the 2011–12 PBA Philippine Cup.

In 2012, after being released by Shopinas.com, the NLEX Road Warriors of the PBA Developmental League signed him. After NLEX's application to go to the PBA was approved, he was one of the players of the original NLEX team who went to play in the PBA.

In 2016, Hermida was signed by SCTEX Road Warriors as one its players for the Pilipinas Commercial Basketball League.

PBA career statistics

Season-by-season averages

|-
| align=left | 
| align=left | Barako Bull
| 6 || 11.5 || .238 || .125 || 1.000 || 1.5 || .7 || .3 || .0 || 2.2
|-
| align=left | 
| align=left | Shopinas.com
| 9 || 9.9 || .259 || .000 || .500 || 1.1 || 1.7 || .8 || .1 || 1.7
|-
| align=left | 
| align=left | NLEX
| 7 || 7.1 || .308 || .250 || 1.000 || 1.0 || .4 || .1 || .0 || 1.7
|-
| align=left | Career
| align=left |
| 22 || 9.5 || .262 || .118 || .857 || 1.2 || 1.0 || .5 || .1 || 1.8

Personal life
He is the youngest of 5 siblings by his parents Carlos L. Hermida and Gliselda M. Hermida.

References

External links
Player Profile at PBA-Online!

1988 births
Living people
Air21 Express players
Barako Bull Energy Boosters players
Filipino men's basketball players
San Beda Red Lions basketball players
NLEX Road Warriors players
Point guards
Basketball players from Manila
Barako Bull Energy Boosters draft picks
Filipino men's basketball coaches
NLEX Road Warriors coaches